WLOE (1490 kHz) and WMYN (1420 kHz) are two AM radio stations simulcasting a News/Talk and Christian radio format.  WLOE is licensed to Eden, North Carolina and WMYN is licensed to nearby Mayodan.  The stations are owned by Mayo Broadcasting and serve the Piedmont Triad of North Carolina, including the Greensboro/Winston-Salem/High Point media market.

Mike and Annette Moore run the station and host an information hour in the morning.

History
WLOE signed on the air on December 26, 1946.  The call letters WLOE were chosen to highlight the phrase "Wonderful Land Of Eden", which was a 19th-century historical description of the area coined by William Byrd during his exploration of the region.  Use of the term pre-dates the establishment of the current city of Eden, as WLOE was originally licensed to the town of Leaksville, North Carolina, which along with the towns of Draper and Spray merged into Eden in 1967.

The WLOE studios and transmitter were originally located just outside Leaksville, in the town of Spray, North Carolina, "...on the busy Boulevard..." as it was often referred to on the air. FM service was added in 1949 on FM channel 224(A) 92.7 MHz, with a power of 820 watts . The call letters of the FM were originally WLOE-FM  The station changed its frequency to 94.5 which is now occupied by WPTI. WLOE-FM eventually changed call letters to WEAF-FM. Mike Moore joined 1490 WLOE and WEAF-FM 94.5 as news director in 1972. The station was sold in 1972 by Doug Craddock, the original owner, to SOCOM Inc.

WMYN first signed on the air on July 15, 1957, originally broadcasting at 500 watts as a daytime-only station.  Today WLOE is 1,000 watts by day, powering down to 68 watts at night to avoid interfering with other stations on 1420 kHz.

References

1955 Broadcasting Yearbook, page 229

External links
 official site

LOE